Neroutsos Inlet is an inlet on the north end of Vancouver Island, off of Quatsino Sound.

Etymology
The inlet was named on 3 May 1927 after Captain Cyril Demetrius Neroutsos (1868–1954), known as "The Skipper", who was manager of Canadian Pacific Railway Coastal Service at the time the feature was named. Obituary & biography in Victoria Times, 14 December 1954 (file A.1.35)

History
Neroutsos participated in the famed New Zealand to London clipper ship races around The Cape, and, with the Australian, South American and East Indies trade, sailed around the world four times before the age of 18. Was signed on with the British India Steam Navigation Company, and was working out of Seattle as the marine superintendent for the Frank Waterhouse Company during the Gold Rush. Joined the Canadian Pacific Navigation Company in 1901, as marine superintendent. Serving aboard S.S. Islander in Alaska waters when she struck an iceberg and sunk in 20 minutes, with great loss of life; Neroutsos was the only executive officer to survive.

References
 BC place name cards, or correspondence to/from BC's Chief Geographer or BC Geographical Names Office

Inlets of British Columbia
Bodies of water of Vancouver Island
Quatsino Sound region